Sign of the Wolf is a 1941 American adventure film directed by Howard Bretherton and written by Elizabeth Sutphin and Edmond Kelso. The film stars Michael Whalen, Grace Bradley, Darryl Hickman, Mantan Moreland, Louise Beavers and Wade Crosby. The film was released on March 25, 1941, by Monogram Pictures.

Plot

Cast          
Michael Whalen as Rod Freeman
Grace Bradley as Judy Weston
Darryl Hickman as Billy Freeman
Mantan Moreland as Ben
Louise Beavers as Beulah
Wade Crosby as Mort Gunning
Tony Paton as Red Fargo 
Joseph E. Bernard as Hank 
Ed Brady as Jules
Eddie Kane as Jack Martin
Brandon Hurst as Dr. Morton

Chapter Titles
The serial chapters are as follows:
  Drums of Doom
  The Dog of Destiny
  The Wolf's Fangs
  The Fatal Shot
  The Well of Terror
  The Wolf Dogs
  Trapped
  The Secret Mark
  Tongues of Flame
  The Lost Secret

References

External links
 

1941 films
American adventure films
1941 adventure films
Monogram Pictures films
Films directed by Howard Bretherton
Films based on works by Jack London
American black-and-white films
1940s English-language films
1940s American films